The Washington Supreme Court is the highest court in the judiciary of the U.S. state of Washington. The court is composed of a chief justice and eight associate justices. Members of the court are elected to six-year terms. Justices must retire at the end of the calendar year in which they reach the age of 75, per the Washington State Constitution.

The chief justice is chosen by secret ballot by the Justices to serve a 4-year term. The current chief justice is Steven C. González, who was elected by his peers on November 5, 2020. González was sworn in as Chief Justice on January 11, 2021, succeeding Debra L. Stephens. 
 
Prior to January 1997 (pursuant to a Constitutional amendment adopted in 1995), the post of chief justice was held for a 2-year term by a justice who (i) was one of the Justices with 2 years left in their term, (ii) was the most senior in years of service of that cohort, and (iii) (generally) had not previously served as chief justice. The last chief justice under the rotation system, Barbara Durham, was the architect of the present internal election system and was the first to be elected under the new procedure, serving until her resignation in 1999.

The court convenes in the Temple of Justice, a historic building on the Washington State Capitol campus in Olympia, Washington.

The persuasiveness of the court's decisions reaches far beyond Washington's borders. A Supreme Court of California study published in 2007 found that the Washington Supreme Court's decisions were the second most widely followed by the appellate courts of all other U.S. states in the period from 1940 to 2005 (second only to California).

Selection 
Members of the court are elected to six-year terms, with three justices elected in each even-numbered year in a nonpartisan election with a top-two primary. Judicial elections in Washington, including for the Supreme Court, are frequently uncontested and incumbents typically win reelection. The last time a justice lost reelection was in 2010 when Charles K. Wiggins defeated Richard B. Sanders, who had previously defeated Rosselle Pekelis in 1995. When chief justice Keith M. Callow lost to Charles W. Johnson in 1990, it was the first time in 40 years an incumbent had lost.

The only required qualification for justices is that they are admitted to practice law in Washington.

In case of a vacancy, the Governor of Washington may appoint a replacement who must stand in the next election to fill the unexpired term. Five of the current nine judges were originally appointed.

Current justices 
As of January 11, 2021:

History
The early history of the Washington Supreme Court has been described as follows:

Candidates for election were originally nominated at party conventions, but in 1907 it became a direct nonpartisan election.

Carolyn R. Dimmick was the first woman to sit on the court, taking her seat in 1981. Barbara Durham was the first female chief justice, selected in 1995. Charles Z. Smith, appointed 1988, was the first African American to serve on the court. Mary Yu became the first LGBT, Asian American, and Latina member in 2014. A majority of justices has been female since 2013. After the appointment of Helen Whitener in 2020, the court was called "arguably the most diverse court, state or federal, in American history", with various incumbents reflecting the state's white, black, Hispanic, Asian American, Native American, LGBT, immigrant, Jewish, and disabled populations.

Notable cases
 McCleary v. Washington (2012) – The state of Washington failed to meet its Constitutional duty to adequately fund education.
 State v. Gregory (2018) – Unanimously decided the death penalty in Washington violated the state constitution, as applied.
 State v. Blake (2021) – Declared in a 5–4 ruling that the statute criminalizing simple possession of controlled substances was unconstitutional.

Gallery

References

External links
Washington State Supreme Court at Ballotpedia
Archives: Walter B. Beals papers. circa 1400–1951. 66.00 cubic feet. At University of Washington Libraries, Special Collections.

 
 
Washington
1889 establishments in Washington (state)
Courts and tribunals established in 1889